The following is an episode list of the Discovery Health Channel, and later OWN, series, Mystery Diagnosis.

Series overview

Episodes

Season 1 (2005)

Season 2 (2006)

Season 3 (2007)

Season 4 (2007)

Season 5 (2008)

Season 6 (2008–09)

Season 7 (2009)

Season 8 (2010)

Season 9 (2010)

Season 10 (2011)

References

External links
 

Mystery Diagnosis